Sheriff Deen (often erroneously reported as Sheriff Mohammed Deen) is a Ghanaian international football player.

Career 
Sheriff played for Accra Hearts of Oak from 2007 to 2008. Sheriff Deen played 17 matches and scored 8 goals for CR Belouizda (Algeria) in 2011, and in 2014 was on loan to a Ghanaian club called Inter Allies FC and currently in top form. He has been a dynamic player and was on top form for Lusaka Dynamo in Zambia 2017-2018 football season.

International 
He was 2009 member of the Ghana national under-23 football team until 2011. On 17. November 2012 was first time called for the Black Stars (Ghana national football team).

Notes

1991 births
Living people
Ghanaian footballers
CR Belouizdad players
Expatriate footballers in Algeria
Algerian Ligue Professionnelle 1 players
Ghanaian expatriate footballers
Expatriate footballers in Bangladesh
Association football forwards
Association football midfielders
Ghanaian expatriate sportspeople in Algeria
Footballers from Accra
Ghanaian expatriate sportspeople in Bangladesh
Ghana international footballers
International Allies F.C. players
Heart of Lions F.C. players